Paradise is a town on the Avalon Peninsula in the province of Newfoundland and Labrador, Canada. Paradise is the third largest settlement in the province and is part of the St. John's metropolitan area, the 20th largest metropolitan area in Canada. The town borders the City of St. John's, the City of Mount Pearl, the Town of Portugal Cove-St. Philip's, and the town of Conception Bay South. According to the 2021 census the population of Paradise was 22,957 an increase of 7.3% from its 2016 population total of 21,389.

History
While parts of Paradise have been inhabited since the late nineteenth century, mainly as farmland, its growth only took off in the 1830s and 1870s as a "bedroom community" of nearby St. John's. It grew at a slow pace until the early 1990s, when the Town of Paradise was amalgamated with the Town of St. Thomas. Other developed areas which had previously been administered by the Southern Metropolitan Board, an agency of the Government of Newfoundland and Labrador, were also amalgamated with Paradise. These areas are Three Island Pond, Topsail Pond, Elizabeth Park, and Evergreen Village. Recently, Paradise has been identified by Statistics Canada as the fastest-growing municipality in Atlantic Canada. There  are 5 schools in Paradise.

Geography
Precambrian bedrock underlies the town, with a belt of volcanic rock along the coast and clastic sedimentary rock inland. The soil is for the most part a stony loam podzol mapped as Cochrane series. Peat is common in poorly drained areas.

Sports
Paradise is the starting point for the annual Tely 10 Mile Road Race, one of the oldest races in Canada. The race begins near Octagon Pond in Paradise before heading towards Mount Pearl.
The town of Paradise, hosted the Toronto Maple Leafs, at its Paradise Double Ice Complex, in September 2019, as the NHL club opened their 2019-2020 training camp in the town. 
In December 2019, the town of Paradise hosted the 2019 Para Hockey Cup, at its Paradise Double Ice Complex, which saw teams from Canada, The United States of America, Russia, and the Czech Republic, participating in the event.

Town crest
The town crest of Paradise was created by a former town council member and one time mayor, "Black" Arch Janes in 1986.   He also provided an explanation of what each element of the crest represented.

 The animal in the top of the crest is a caribou. The caribou is currently the provincial animal of Newfoundland.
 There are two bulldogs holding up the crest.  These are the representation of Britain's Royal Navy.  Newfoundland was a protectorate of Great Britain before becoming a province of Canada in 1949.
 The cross located on the center of the crest is a representation of the Christian religion on which the laws of Newfoundland are founded.
 The gear and electric bolt located in the top two portions of the crest represent industry in the community.
 The lower left corner of the crest bears a tree.  This symbol is a representation of the town's name.  Paradise in Greek means a park.
 The lower right corner of the crest is a sled filled with wood.  This symbol represents Paradise's past industry, which was primarily in the wood industry.

This information was collected from the official town website, see below.

War memorial
The War memorial located at the town hall was also designed by Arch Janes before his death in 1987.

Government
The Paradise town council is made up of a mayor, deputy mayor, and five councillors. The current mayor of the town is Dan Bobbett, a former Paradise town councillor.

Paradise is part of three provincial electoral districts; Conception Bay East – Bell Island, represented by David Brazil, and Topsail-Paradise, which is represented by Paul Dinn. Sarah Stoodley, the MHA for Mount Scio, also represents a small part of the Elizabeth Park subdivision in Paradise, near the Mount Pearl border. Dianne Whalen was the mayor of Paradise for 18 years before entering provincial politics in 2003.

The town is represented in Parliament by two MPs: Joanne Thompson, who represents the district of St. John's East, and Ken McDonald, who represents the district of Avalon.

2009 mayoral election controversy
On September 29, 2009, Newfoundland and Labrador held municipal elections in its municipalities. Paradise had two people running for mayor – incumbent Ralph Wiseman and 19-year-old Kurtis Coombs.

On September 30, it was announced that Coombs had won the election, making him the youngest mayor in Canada. He had beat Wiseman by three votes, having 1,821 votes compared to Wiseman's 1,818. However, a recount revealed that the two were tied. Under Newfoundland and Labrador's Municipal Elections Act, a draw is used to determine the winner if a recount results in a tie. Wiseman was announced the mayor when a piece of paper with his name was drawn out of a recycle bin that contained both his name and Coombs'. Coombs planned on requesting a judicial recount and recommended that another election be held.

On October 6, a judge ordered that the results be recounted again, which took place on October 13. The following day it was announced that the recount resulted in another tie. Joyce Moss, the town's chief returning officer, stated that the result from the random draw will stand, resulting in Wiseman remaining as the town's mayor.

Demographics 

Based on the 2016 Census, the median income for the Town of Paradise was $107,542 before taxes and a median income of $89,037 after taxes.

Notable people 
 Sarah Davis, women's hockey player
 Carl English, professional basketball player

See also

 List of cities and towns in Newfoundland and Labrador

References

Towns in Newfoundland and Labrador